"The Rime of King William" is an Old English poem that tells the death of William the Conqueror. The Rime was a part of the only entry for the year of 1087 (though improperly dated 1086) in the "Peterborough Chronicle/Laud Manuscript." In this entry there is a thorough history and account of the life of King William. The entry in its entirety is regarded "as containing the best contemporary estimate of William's achievements and character as seen by a reasonably objective Englishman" (Bartlett, 89). As a resource, earlier writers drew from this in a more literal sense, while later historians referred to it more liberally. The text in its original language can be found in The Peterborough Chronicle 1070–1154, edited by Cecily Clark. A modern translation can be found in the Anglo-Saxon Chronicles translated by G.N. Garmonsway. Seth Lerer has published a more recent modern translation of "The Rime of King William" in his article, "Old English and Its Afterlife," in The Cambridge History of Medieval English Literature.

Text and translation

Summary 

The Rime itself is short, and is more of a criticism of King William rather than praise of his reign. It also acts as a summation of that year's entry. The author appears to have chosen a few points that he may have found particularly interesting and turned them into a poem within the entry for the year. Depending on the editor's choice of line arrangement, the poem is somewhere between 17 and 32 lines long, depending on whether the editor arranges according to Old English alliterative meter or as rhyming couplets.

Authorship 
The author of this Rime, as with many Old English texts, is unknown, but the author does offer an important detail earlier in his entry. 
"The one definite piece of information which he gives is that he was a member of William's household" (Whiting, 91–92).
Þonne wille we be him awritan swa swa we hine ageaton, Þe him on locodon an ore on his hirede weredon.
[Then shall he write of him, as we have known him, who have ourselves seen him and at time dwelt in his court.] (Garmonsway, 219)
So, at one point the author was a member of the royal household. When and for how long is not sure. Beyond this, there are no other facts offered but it is safe to assume that the author was a monk or a member of a religious house.

Artistic criticism 

This poem has been criticized for being immature and "a garbled attempt at rhyming poetry: a poem without regular metre, formalized lineation or coherent imagery" (Lerer, 7). Many other scholars support this criticism. Professors George Philip Krapp and Elliott Van Kirk Dobbie did not include the Rime in their six-volume Anglo Saxon Poetic Records. Its value as a representation of Old English literature as well as the quality of the poem, simply as a poem, is called into question. The end rhyming is unlike the alliterative Old English poetry, which is the basis for most scholarly criticism. Bartlett Whiting refers to the Rime as having "a lack of technical merit," referring to the sudden jump from prose of the formal entry, to that of the "rough and ready verse" (89). With its end-rhymes it is often taken as an example of the transition to Middle English.

Significance 

No matter the quality of the Rime's rhymes, the spelling of this Rime was used to age both the text itself as well as chart morphology in Old English texts. Whiting refers to the specific dropping of the final n, indicative of the loss of inflectional endings from Old to Middle English (Whiting, 89).

The poem serves as "an elegy for an age as much as for a king, this entry as a whole constitutes a powerfully literary, and literate, response to the legacies of pre-Conquest English writing" (Lerer, 12). The text offers both the political time line (the twenty first year that William I ruled) and a religious timeline (one thousand eighty-seven years after the birth of Jesus Christ).

Within the form of the lament for King William it expresses the indignation of the English at the introduction of the Norman forest law. Stefan Jurasinski has shown that it is most likely by the compiler of the Peterborough Chronicle himself and that it stands at the head of a developing tradition of literary polemics against the injustice of the forest laws ("The Rime of King William and its Analogues").

Digital Facsimile Edition and Modern Translation 

 Foys, Martin et al. Old English Poetry in Facsimile Project (Center for the History of Print and Digital Culture, University of Wisconsin-Madison, 2019-); digital facsimile edition and Modern English translation.

Notes

References
Bartlett J. Whiting, '"The Rime of King William", Philologica: The Malone Anniversary Studies, Eds. T. A. Kirby and H. B. Woolf (Baltimore: Johns Hopkins) 1949.
Clark, Cecily. The Peterborough Chronicles. First. London: Oxford University Press, 1958.
Garmonsway, G.N. The Anglo-Saxon Chronicle. First. London: J.M. Dent & Sons LTD., 1953.
Lerer, Seth. The Cambridge History of Medieval English Literature. “Old English and Its Afterlife.” Cambridge: Cambridge University Press, 1999.
Jurankski, Stefan. "The Rime of King William and its Analogues", Neophilologus, 88.1, (January 2004), pp. 131–144; .
Wallace, David,  2002 (ed.) The Cambridge History of Medieval English Literature, Cambridge University Press, The Rime of King William pp. 15–16.

Old English poems
Cultural depictions of William the Conqueror